The Hundredfold Problem is a science fiction novel written by John Grant. The original version, published by Virgin Books in 1994, was based on the long-running British science fiction comic strip Judge Dredd. A new edition was published in 2003 by BeWrite Books, in which all references to Judge Dredd had been removed, and the lead character was a police officer called Dave Knuckle.

Synopsis (Judge Dredd version)
A four-million-year-old Dyson sphere has been discovered surrounding a red dwarf star orbiting the Sun, populated by the descendants of the Neanderthals. Mega-City One has enslaved its inhabitants and is using it as a prison to which to exile its worst criminals. When a feud on the sphere threatens to destroy it, Judges Dredd and "heavy-weapons-toting xeno-anthropologist and scantily clad babe" Petula McTavish are sent to protect it. However a malfunction in Dredd's teleportation to the sphere causes one hundred evil versions of him to be produced.

See also
Burning Heart by Dave Stone was another Judge Dredd novel which was rewritten without Dredd, and became a Doctor Who book in 1997, still published by Virgin Books. However the original version was never published.

External links
Judge Dredd: The Hundredfold Problem at the 2000 AD website.
Review of the BeWrite edition by Stuart Jaffe at Infinity Plus

Judge Dredd novels
1994 British novels
2003 novels
Novels set in the 22nd century
Virgin Books books